Cystostereum murrayi is a species of fungus belonging to the family Cystostereaceae.

It has cosmopolitan distribution.

References

Cystostereaceae